Middle Vaitarna Dam is a dam in Maharashtra, India.
 
It was built on the Vaitarna river in Thane's Kochale village in 2012. The city receives only 3,400 million litres per day (Mld) compared to the 4,000 Mld of demand. The water is expected to be transported to Bhandup treatment plant with a  pipeline and delivered to the city.

The project was partly funded by the Jawarharlal Nehru National Urban Renewal Mission. It also affected about eight villages and several adivasi padas in the region. Of these, only 35 families who lost their homes were rehabilitated in a colony near the project site of Kochale village. A visit to the rehabilitation colony in 2012 and in January 2014 where the project affected families moved in last year revealed extremely poor construction quality

See also
 Vaitarna Dam
 Upper Vaitarana Dam

References 

Dams in Thane district
Dams completed in 2012
2012 establishments in Maharashtra
It is third most tallest dam